Julia Emma Maria Tunturi (born 25 April 1996) is a Finnish footballer who plays as a midfielder for Vittsjö GIK and the Finland national team. She previously played for TPS and Åland United of the Naisten Liiga.

Club career
In November 2017 Tunturi agreed a transfer from TPS to Eskilstuna United DFF of the Swedish Damallsvenskan. Calling the move "a step up" in her career, she described herself as a left-footed player who prefers a central midfield role. She signed a two-year, full-time professional contract with Eskilstuna United.

International career
Tunturi made her debut for the Finland women's national team on 6 March 2015, in a 0–0 draw with the Netherlands at the 2015 Cyprus Cup. She was named in the 2013 UEFA Women's Under-19 Championship Team of the Tournament, after Finland reached the semi-finals. She was also a member of the Finland squad at the 2014 FIFA U-20 Women's World Cup in Canada.

References

External links
 
 Julia Tunturi profile at Football Association of Finland (SPL) 

1996 births
Finnish women's footballers
Finnish expatriate footballers
Living people
Finland women's international footballers
Kansallinen Liiga players
Eskilstuna United DFF players
Damallsvenskan players
Expatriate women's footballers in Sweden
Finnish expatriate sportspeople in Sweden
Åland United players
Turun Palloseura (women's football) players
Women's association football midfielders
Footballers from Helsinki
Pargas Idrottsförening players